Paudie O'Brien (born 5 September 1989) is an Irish hurler who currently plays as a midfielder for the Limerick senior team.

Biography
O'Brien made his first appearance for the team during the 2011 championship and has been a regular member of the starting fifteen since then. He has enjoyed little success during his senior inter-county career. O'Brien is the current vice-captain of the Limerick team.

At club level O'Brien is a two-time county club championship medalist with Kilmallock.

Honours
Inter-county
Munster Senior Hurling Championship (1): 2013
National Hurling League Division 2 (1): 2011

References 

1989 births
Living people
Kilmallock hurlers
Limerick inter-county hurlers